The 1998 Nidahas Trophy, known as the Singer Akai Nidahas Trophy for sponsorship reasons, was a One Day International cricket tournament staged in Sri Lanka between 19 June and 7 July 1998, to commemorate the 50 years of Sri Lanka's independence and Sri Lanka Cricket, known then as the Board of Control for Cricket in Sri Lanka, the governing body of cricket in Sri Lanka.

The competition involved Sri Lanka, India and New Zealand. Each team played every other team three times, and the two teams with most points progressed to the final. The event was marred by rain, with five of the nine qualifying matches abandoned. Sri Lanka won three matches while India won one in the group stage, before India won the final beating the former by 6 runs. Sri Lanka's Aravinda de Silva who scored 368 runs was named player of the series.

Squads

Round-robin

Matches

Final

References

External links
 Singer Akai Nidahas Trophy at ESPN Cricinfo
 

1998 in Sri Lankan cricket
International cricket competitions from 1997–98 to 2000
International sports competitions hosted by Sri Lanka